The Texas League of Minor League Baseball is a Double-A baseball league in the United States. The circuit was founded in 1888 and ran through 1892. After two years of dormancy, it was revived as the Texas Association in 1895, the Texas-Southern League in 1896, and the Texas League from 1897 to 1899. With the exception of three years during World War II (1943–1945) and one year during the COVID-19 pandemic (2020), the Texas League has been in continual operation since 1902.

A league champion has determined at the end of each season. Champions have been determined by postseason playoffs, winning the regular season pennant, or being declared champion by the league office. From 1952 to 1964, the league recognized both a pennant winner and a playoff winner; they were declared co-champions. For the 2019 season, the first-half and second-half winners within each division (North and South) met in a best-of-five series to determine division champions. Then, the North and South Division winners played a best-of-five series to determine a league champion. In 2021, the Double-A Central held a best-of-five series between the top two teams in the league, regardless of division standings, to determine a league champion. As of 2022, the winners of each division from both the first and second halves of the season meet in a best-of-three division series, with the winners of the two division series meeting in a best-of-three championship series.

The 2020 season was cancelled due to the COVID-19 pandemic, and the league ceased operations before the 2021 season in conjunction with Major League Baseball's (MLB) reorganization of Minor League Baseball. In place of the Texas League, MLB created the Double-A Central, which was divided into two divisions. Prior to the 2022 season, MLB renamed the Double-A Central as the Texas League, and it carried on the history of the league prior to reorganization.

Key

League champions
Score and finalist information is presented when postseason play occurred. The lack of this information indicates a league champion by virtue of finishing the season in first place or missing information.

Championship wins by team

Notes
 Galveston and San Antonio were declared co-champions.
 Dallas and Houston were declared co-champions.
 Waco and Houston were declared co-champions.
 Midland and Lafayette were declared co-champions.
 Arkansas was declared champion after playoffs were cancelled in the wake the September 11, 2001 terrorist attacks, which caused a stoppage in professional baseball.

References
General

Specific

Texas League champions
Texas League
C
Texas League champions
Texas League